Robert de Béthune VII ( – 12 November 1248 in Sardinia) was a nobleman from the House of Bethune from Artois. He served as a knight and military leader in Flanders and England before inheriting his family territories in France and the Low Countries. He joined the Seventh Crusade, but died en route to the eastern Mediterranean.

Biography
He was a younger son of Lord William II of Béthune (d. 1214) and his wife, Mathilda of Dendermonde.

Robert had no hope of a large inheritance, as his elder brother Daniel (d. 1226) would inherit the Lordship of Béthune.  He therefore decided to become a knight at the court of Count Ferdinand of Flanders.  The House of Bethune was one of the more influential families in Artois, which had been a Flemish fief until Flanders had to cede it to the French heir apparent Louis, the son of Isabella of Hainault.  Count Baldwin IX of Flanders had ceded Artois to Hainault in the Treaty of Péronne.  However, his son-in-law Ferdinand pursued a policy aiming to recover Artois.  This brought him into conflict with the French royal family.  The House of Béthune was split by this power struggle: Robert's father and brother were loyal to the French liege lord, while Robert sided with Flanders.

In 1213, Robert accompanied Count Ferdinand into exile in England after King Philip II of France had invaded Flanders.  Later that year, he and the Earl of Salisbury led a successful attack on the French fleet in the port of Damme, thereby thwarting an impending invasion of England.  The following year, he participated in the decisive Battle of Bouvines (27 July 1214).  King Philip II won the battle, and took Count Ferdinand prisoner.  Robert was taken prisoner by a French knight, who released him, after Robert promised to pay a ransom.  This story was recorded by an anonymous chronicler, who was employed by Robert and who wrote between 1220 and 1223 a chronicle about the French kings entitled 

In 1227, Count Ferdinand was released from prison. He paid homage to the French king and gave his hope of recapturing Artois.

Robert apparently came closer to the French crown in the following years.  In 1236, he is named as a guarantor of the Treaty of Péronne, which must imply that he now recognized this treaty.

In 1248, Robert decided to join the crusade of King Louis IX of France to Egypt (the Seventh Crusade).  During a stopover in Sardinia, en route to Cyprus, he fell ill and died.  He was buried in Arras.

Marriage and issue 
Robert was married to Elisabeth of Morialmez.  He had a daughter, Matilda (d. 1264).  In 1246, she married Guy of Dampierre, who was related to the Counts of Flanders and inherited the county in 1251.  Since Robert had no sons, Matilda and Guy also inherited Béthune.  Their son, Robert III ceded Béthune to France in 1312.

A junior line of the House of Béthune, descended from Robert's younger brother Guillaume III (d. 1243), survives to this day as Lords of Meulebeke.

References 
 Charles Emmanuel Joseph Poplimont: La Belgique héraldique: recueil historique, chronologique, généalogique et biographique complet de toutes les maisons nobles, reconnues de la Belgique, vol. 1, 1863
 E. Warlop: The Flemish Nobility before 1300, Kortrijk, 1975-1976
 Pierre Bruyelle, Alain Derville: Histoire de Béthune et de Beuvry, 1985

Footnotes 

Christians of the Sixth Crusade
Christians of the Seventh Crusade
Lords of France
Year of birth uncertain
1248 deaths
13th-century French people